Otepää Valgjärv is a lake in Kanepi Parish, Põlva County, Estonia.

See also
List of lakes of Estonia

References

Kanepi Parish
Lakes of Põlva County